The New Zealand Men's Curling Championship is the national championship of men's curling in New Zealand. It has been held annually since 2005. From 1994 to 2004 the national champions were the winners of the Wendorf Rock, and the event was open to both genders. Some winning teams had men's and women's players.

List of champions

The Wendorf Rock

New Zealand Curling Championship—Men

See also
New Zealand Women's Curling Championship
New Zealand Mixed Doubles Curling Championship
New Zealand Mixed Curling Championship

Notes

References

External links
NZ Championship : Men

Curling competitions in New Zealand
Recurring sporting events established in 2005
2005 establishments in New Zealand
Recurring sporting events established in 1994
1994 establishments in New Zealand
National curling championships
Men's sports competitions in New Zealand